Je l'ai été trois fois , is a French comedy film from 1952, directed by Sacha Guitry, written by Sacha Guitry, starring Sacha Guitry and Louis de Funès. The English international title of this film is "She and Me".

Plot
The matured actor Jean Renneval has a secret affair with the wife of a well-heeled merchant. When Renneval has to play a clergyman, he visits the wife while still in costume. That's the day when the cuckolded husband sees the two of them together. Renneval tries to defuse the situation by pretending he was a real clergyman. But this leads to some new problems for Renneval.

Cast 
 Sacha Guitry as Jean Renneval
 Louis de Funès as the interpreter-secretary of the sultan of Hammanlif
 Bernard Blier as Henri Verdier, jeweller - Hector Van Broken, look-alike of Henry
 Lana Marconi as Thérèse Verdier, Henri's third wife
 Simone Paris as Lucie Verdier, Henri's first wife
 Meg Lemonnier as Henriette Le Havray, friend of Thérèse
 Solange Varennes as Juliette Verdier, the seconde spouse of Henri
 Pauline Carton as Mme Dutiquesnois, Jean Renneval's dresser
 Ginette Taffin as Julie
 Primerose Perret as Andrée, a girl
 Janine Camp as Suzette, another girl
 Jacques Eyser as the Sultan of Hammanlif
 Henri Arius as the doctor Marinier
 Jacques Anquetil as the  elevator operator
 Sophie Mallet as Zoé
 Christine Darbel as actress
 Jean Chevrier: a man in front of the hotel
 Lucien Callamand as un monsieur
 Roger Poirier as the manager and a bodyguard

References

External links 
 
 Je l'ai été trois fois (1952) at the Films de France

1952 films
French comedy films
1950s French-language films
French black-and-white films
Films directed by Sacha Guitry
1952 comedy films
1950s French films